The thirteenth season of Supernatural, an American dark fantasy television series created by Eric Kripke, premiered on October 12, 2017, on The CW and concluded on May 17, 2018. The season consists of 23 episodes and aired on Thursdays at 8:00 pm (ET). This is the second season with Andrew Dabb and Robert Singer as showrunners.

This season featured a backdoor pilot to a possible spin-off series called Wayward Sisters, starring Kim Rhodes as Sheriff Jody Mills, Briana Buckmaster as Sheriff Donna Hanscum, Kathryn Newton as Claire Novak, Katherine Ramdeen as Alex Jones, Clark Backo as Patience Turner and Yadira Guevara-Prip as Kaia Nieves. The spin-off was ultimately not chosen to move forward as a series. The season also featured an animated crossover episode with Scooby-Doo. The season follows Sam and Dean who, after locating and saving Lucifer's offspring, try to use his powers to find a way back to the Apocalypse World, and save their mother, Mary.

Cast

Starring
 Jared Padalecki as Sam Winchester
 Jensen Ackles as Dean Winchester / Michael
 Mark Pellegrino as Lucifer
 Alexander Calvert as Jack Kline
 Misha Collins as Castiel

Special guest stars
 Loretta Devine as Missouri Moseley
 Jim Beaver as Bobby Singer
 Felicia Day as Charlie Bradbury

Guest stars

Episodes

Production
Supernatural was renewed for a thirteenth season by The CW on January 8, 2017. This season is the first season not to feature Mark A. Sheppard as Crowley since his introduction in the fifth season, as the actor announced in May 2017 he would not be returning after his character was killed off for the last time. Alexander Calvert, who was introduced as Jack in the twelfth season finale, was promoted to series regular for this season.

Reception
The review aggregator website Rotten Tomatoes reports a 100% approval rating for Supernatural's thirteenth season, with an average rating of 7.87/10 based on 7 reviews.

Ratings

Notes

References

External links

Supernatural 13
2017 American television seasons
2018 American television seasons